Grind is a 1997 American drama film directed by Chris Kentis and written by Laura Lau. It stars Billy Crudup, Adrienne Shelly, and Paul Schulze. Crudup plays an ex-con caught in a spiral of dead-end jobs and poor choices.

Overview 
A handsome drifter who has just been released from prison shows up on the doorstep of his older brother.

Cast 
 Billy Crudup as Eddie
 Adrienne Shelly as Janey
 Paul Schulze as Terry
 Frank Vincent as Nick
 Amanda Peet as Patty

Release 
Grind was released April 11, 1997, in the United States, where it made $5000.

Reception 
Stephen Holden of The New York Times wrote that the film initially has the potential to be "an American neo-realist gem" but descends into melodrama.  Leonard Klady of Variety wrote, "While director and co-writer Chris Kentis' debut feature is not distinctive visually or more than mildly intriguing dramatically, neither is it offensive or inept."  Nathan Rabin of The A.V. Club wrote, "While Grind captures its blue-collar milieu with a certain amount of accuracy and conviction, it can't overcome its weak, predictable script and uneven performances."  Kevin Thomas of The Los Angeles Times called it "a fine and involving accomplishment" that should launch the careers of all involved.

References

External links 
 
 

1997 films
1997 drama films
American auto racing films
American drama films
American independent films
1997 directorial debut films
1997 independent films
Films directed by Chris Kentis
1990s English-language films
1990s American films